The men's decathlon event at the 1932 Olympic Games took place between August 5 & August 6. Points are listed by the scoring table from 1912 which were used to determine the winner.  Adjusted points are points using the 1985 scoring table.  The official Olympic results shows both results, but medal winners were determined by the 1912 scoring table.

Results

100 metres

Long jump

Shot put

High jump

400 metres

110 metre hurdles

Discus throw

Pole vault

Javelin throw

1500 metres

Final standings

Key: WR = World Record, DNF = Did not finish, OB = Olympic best

References

Men's decathlon
1932
Men's events at the 1932 Summer Olympics